New Wandsworth was a railway station in Wandsworth. The station was opened by the West End of London and Crystal Palace Railway on the 29 March 1858 when the railway extended its line from Wandsworth to Pimlico. It closed on 1 November 1869, six years after  had opened a short distance to the north and was replaced by Wandsworth Common station.

The station was close to the London and South Western Railway's Clapham Common station located on a separate line, with both stations being open between 1858 and 1863.

References

   
 
 
 
 

Disused railway stations in the London Borough of Wandsworth
Former London, Brighton and South Coast Railway stations
Railway stations in Great Britain opened in 1858
Railway stations in Great Britain closed in 1869